Tong Wen (born 1 February 1983 in Tianjin) is a Chinese judoka. Born in Tianjin, she began training in Judo when she was 13.

In the 2008 Summer Olympics she won the gold medal. She also won gold medals at the world championships of 2003, 2005, 2007, 2009 and 2011 as well as a bronze medal in 2001.

On May 10, 2010, she was banned for two years by the International Judo Federation because of Clenbuterol doping and was required to give back her gold medal from the World Championships of 2009. Tong subsequently contested the ban and took her case to the Court of Arbitration for Sport which ruled that a doping violation could not be proved and found, in her favor, ordering that she be reinstated immediately with all rights. She returned to international competition in May 2011, winning gold at the Moscow Grand Slam.

References

External links
 
 
 

1983 births
Living people
Judoka at the 2008 Summer Olympics
Judoka at the 2012 Summer Olympics
Olympic gold medalists for China
Olympic bronze medalists for China
Olympic judoka of China
Sportspeople from Tianjin
Place of birth missing (living people)
Olympic medalists in judo
Asian Games medalists in judo
Judoka at the 2002 Asian Games
Judoka at the 2006 Asian Games
Medalists at the 2012 Summer Olympics
Medalists at the 2008 Summer Olympics
Chinese female judoka
Asian Games gold medalists for China
Medalists at the 2002 Asian Games
Medalists at the 2006 Asian Games
Universiade medalists in judo
Manchu sportspeople
Universiade bronze medalists for China
21st-century Chinese women